General elections were held in Luxembourg on 10 June 1979. The Christian Social People's Party remained the largest party, winning 24 of the 59 seats in the Chamber of Deputies. After spending the previous four years in opposition, it returned to government in coalition with the Democratic Party, resulting in the Werner-Thorn Ministry.

Results

References

Chamber of Deputies (Luxembourg) elections
Luxembourg
Legislative election, 1979
History of Luxembourg (1945–present)
Luxembourg